Andrew Rodriguez may refer to:

 Andrew Rodriguez (singer-songwriter) (born 1971), Canadian singer-songwriter
 Andrew Rodriguez (American football) (born 1990), American football player